In the 1952–53 season, Al Ahly won the double for the second time after winning it in the 1950–51 season, by winning the league for the fourth time, with only two points ahead of Zamalek, and winning the Egypt Cup after defeating Zamalek in the final 4–1.

The Egyptian Football Association decided this season to play the Cairo League with the youth teams instead of the first team as usual.

Competitions

Overview

Egyptian Premier League

League table

League table 

 (C)= Champions, (R)= Relegated, Pld = Matches played; W = Matches won; D = Matches drawn; L = Matches lost; F = Goals for; A = Goals against; ± = Goal difference; Pts = Points.

Matches

Egypt Cup

Final

References

Al Ahly SC seasons
Egyptian football clubs 1952–53 season
1952–53 in African association football leagues